Stipulicida is a genus of flowering plants belonging to the family Caryophyllaceae.

Its native range is Southeastern US, Cuba.

Species:

Stipulicida lacerata 
Stipulicida setacea

References

Caryophyllaceae
Caryophyllaceae genera